Cadavre may refer to:

 cadaver
 Un Cadavre (A Cadaver), a surrealist pamphlet 
 Cadavre exquis (surrealism)
 Cadavres (2009 film)
 A fictional character created by Kris Straub for Chainsawsuit, Broodhollow, and Local 58